The 1976 United States Senate election in West Virginia was held on November 2, 1976. Incumbent Democratic U.S. Senator Robert Byrd won re-election to a fourth term. The Republican Party did not field a candidate for this election, leading to a 100% election victory for Robert Byrd. Byrd's 566,359 votes is the most received by a Democrat in any statewide election in the state's history.

Democratic primary

Candidate 
 Robert Byrd, incumbent U.S. Senator

Results

General election

Result

See also 
 1976 United States Senate elections

References 

West Virginia
1976
1976 West Virginia elections
Robert Byrd